Megachile frigida is a species of bee in the family Megachilidae. It was described by Smith in 1853. It nests underground.

References

Frigida
Insects described in 1853